Claudio Rodríguez García was a Spanish poet. He took part in the Generation of '50. He was member of the Royal Spanish Academy and the Royal Galician Academy. He received the Prince of Asturias Award for Literature in 1993.

References 

1934 births
1999 deaths
People from Zamora, Spain
Spanish male poets
20th-century Spanish poets
University of Salamanca alumni
Members of the Royal Spanish Academy